"Protect Your Mind (Braveheart)" (also known as "Protect Your Mind (For the Love of a Princess)") is a 1998 song recorded by Turkish-German trance music project DJ Sakin & Friends featuring vocals by singer Janet Taylor. It peaked at No. 1 in Scotland and reached the top 5 in Denmark, Germany, Ireland and the United Kingdom. In 1999, it was included on DJ Sakin's first and only album, Walk On Fire. "Protect Your Mind" was nominated to the 1999 Echo Awards for best dance single.

Track listing

Charts and certifications

Weekly charts

Year-end charts

Certifications

References

1998 debut singles
1998 songs
Songs written by James Horner
House music songs
Trance songs
Number-one singles in Scotland